The 3rd (Lahore) Division was an infantry division of the British Indian Army, first organised in 1852. It saw service during World War I as part of the Indian Corps in France before being moved to the Middle East where it fought against troops of the Ottoman Empire.

Pre-Mutiny
The Lahore Division first appears in the Indian Army List in 1852, when the short-lived Cis-Jhelum Division was renamed (at the same time the Trans-Jhelum Division at Peshawar was renamed the Punjab Division). The Cis-Jhelum Division in turn had previously been the Saugor Division, a longstanding formation of the Bengal Army. At this period Divisions were primarily administrative organisations controlling the brigades and stations in their area, rather than field formations, but they did provide field forces when required. The Lahore Division absorbed the Lahore Field Force under Brigadier Sir James Tennant, which had formed part of the Army of the Punjab since 1847. Lahore Fort was occupied by the British after the First Anglo-Sikh War and the city of Lahore was annexed in 1849 at the conclusion of the Second Anglo-Sikh War. In 1852 a military cantonment (known until 1906 as Mian Mir) was established outside the city.

Composition 1852
General Officer Commanding (GOC): Brigadier-General Sir John Cheape, KCB, Bengal Engineers (appointed 9 July 1852) (absent commanding Bengal Division in Second Anglo-Burmese War).

Lahore:
Commanding Station: Brigadier Sir James Tennant, Bengal Artillery
HQ, 1st and 2nd Troops, 3rd Brigade, Bengal Horse Artillery
HQ, 1st, 2nd, 3rd and 4th Companies, 2nd (European) Battalion, Bengal Foot Artillery (1st Company and O Company Ordnance Drivers manning No 7 Light Field Battery (horsedrawn))
2nd Company, 8th (Native) Battalion, Bengal Foot Artillery, and D Company Ordnance drivers, manning No 2 Light Field Battery (bullock drawn)
4th Company, Bengal Sappers and Miners
Her Majesty's 96th Foot
5th Bengal Native Infantry
9th Bengal Native Infantry
39th Bengal Native Infantry
57th Bengal Native Infantry
65th Bengal Native Infantry
1st Bengal Irregular Cavalry (Skinner's Horse)
18th Bengal Irregular Cavalry

Wazirabad:
Brigadier J.R. Hearsey
4th Company 7th (Native) Battalion, Bengal Foot Artillery
Her Majesty's 3rd Light Dragoons
Her Majesty's 10th Foot
Her Majesty's 24th Foot
21st Bengal Native Infantry
32nd Bengal Native Infantry
34th Bengal Native Infantry

Sialkot:
Lieutenant-Colonel J.T. Lane, Bengal Artillery
2nd Troop, 2nd Brigade, Bengal Horse Artillery
1st Company, 1st (European) Battalion, Bengal Foot Artillery
10th Company, Bengal Sappers and Miners
4th Bengal Light Cavalry
Detachment Her Majesty's 24th Foot
63rd Bengal Native Infantry
6th Bengal Irregular Cavalry

Govindgarh (Bathinda):
3rd Company, 8th (Native) Battalion, Bengal Foot Artillery
Detachments Her Majesty's 10th Foot and Native Infantry

Indian mutiny
During the 'Indian Mutiny' (or 'First War of Independence') some Indian regiments at the Mian Mir cantonments plotted to mutiny but were disarmed under the guns of a British horse artillery battery and infantry battalion to prevent them seizing Lahore Fort. Later the 26th Bengal Native Infantry at Mian Mir did mutiny, murder some of their officers and escape under cover of a dust storm, but Lahore was held for the remainder of the conflict by British troops and Indians troops loyal to the government.

Post-Mutiny
Over succeeding decades, the stations controlled by Lahore Division varied, and the forces under command were regularly rotated. For example:

Composition January 1888
GOC: Maj-Gen Sir Hugh Henry Gough, VC (appointed 1 April 1887)Aide-de-Camp: Capt H.F.M. Wilson, Rifle Brigade

Divisional HQ: Mian Mir (Lahore Cantonment)

Mian Mir:
K Battery, 3rd Brigade, Royal Artillery
O Battery, 4th Brigade, Royal Artillery
2nd Battalion, Northumberland Fusiliers
5th Regiment Bengal Cavalry
24th (Punjab) Regiment, Bengal Infantry
32nd (Punjab) Regiment Bengal Infantry (Pioneers)
34th (Punjab) Regiment Bengal Infantry (Pioneers)

Fort Lahore:
3rd Battery, 1st Brigade, Scottish Division Garrison Artillery, Royal Artillery
Detachment 2nd Battalion, Northumberland Fusiliers

Multan Brigade:
B Battery 1st Brigade, Royal Artillery
2nd Battalion, West Yorkshire Regiment
10th Bengal (Duke of Cambridge's Own) Cavalry
25th (Punjab) Regiment Bengal Native Infantry

Ferozepore: 
L Battery, 4th Brigade, Royal Artillery
9th Battery, 1st Brigade, Eastern Division Garrison Artillery, Royal Artillery
1st Battalion, East Lancashire Regiment
17th Regiment of Bengal Cavalry
19th (Punjab) Regiment Bengal Native Infantry
35th (Sikh) Regiment Bengal Native Infantry

Amritsar:
Detachment 1st Battalion, Border Regiment
Detachment 24th (Punjab) Regiment Bengal Native Infantry

Dharamsala:
1st Battalion, 1st Goorkha Light Infantry
2nd Battalion, 1st Goorkha Light Infantry

Bakloh (near Dalhousie):
1st Battalion, 4th Goorkha Regiment
2nd Battalion, 4th Goorkha Regiment

Pre–World War I
Under the reforms introduced by Lord Roberts as Commander-in-Chief (CinC) India, the Divisions were renamed 1st Class Districts in 1890. In the next round of reforms inaugurated by Lord Kitchener as CinC, they became numbered divisions with their territorial affiliation as a subsidiary title. The title 3rd (Lahore) Division first appears in the Army List between 30 September and 31 December 1904, as part of Northern Command, with the Jullunder, Sirhind and Ambala brigades under command. Lahore District/3rd (Lahore) Division at this time was under the command of Maj-Gen Walter Kitchener, the CinC's younger brother, who commanded it at the Rawalpindi Parade 1905. In 1914 the division, with HQ at Dalhousie,  consisted of the Ferozepore, Jullunder (based at Dalhousie) and Sirhind (based at Kasauli) infantry brigades, and the Ambala cavalry brigade (based at Kasauli).

World War I

Western Front 1914

 
In 1914 the 3rd (Lahore) Division was part of Indian Expeditionary Force A sent to reinforce the British Expeditionary Force (BEF) fighting in France. The bulk constituted an infantry division as part of Indian Corps, while the Ambala Cavalry Brigade was detached to form part of 1st Indian Cavalry Division in the Indian Cavalry Corps. While in France the division was known as the Lahore Division, and its brigades by their names, to avoid confusion with the 3rd British Division. Despatch from India was delayed by the activities of the German raiders Emden and Konigsberg operating in the Indian Ocean, and by the slow speed of the transport vessels. The first two brigades landed at Marseilles on 26 September 1914, but there were further delays while the troops were re-armed with the latest pattern rifle, and the supply train could be improvised, using tradesmen's vans procured locally.

The 3rd Lahore Divisional Area was formed in late 1914 to take over the garrison duties of the 3rd Division when it left for France. The 3rd Lahore Divisional Area was disbanded in May 1917, the responsibilities of the area being taken over by the 16th Division.

Order of Battle October 1914
GOC: Lieut-Gen H.B.B. Watkis, CB

Ferozepore Brigade
GOC: Brig-Gen R.G. Egerton, CB
 1st Battalion, Connaught Rangers
 9th Bhopal Infantry
 57th Wilde's Rifles (Frontier Force)
 129th Duke of Connaught's Own Baluchis

Jullundur Brigade
GOC: Maj-Gen P.M. Carnegy, CB
 1st Battalion, Manchester Regiment
 4th Battalion, Suffolk Regiment (Territorial Force) - joined from GHQ Reserve 4 December 1914
 15th Ludhiana Sikhs
 47th Sikhs
 59th Scinde Rifles (Frontier Force)

Sirhind Brigade - arrived at Marseilles from Egypt 30 November, joined 9 December 1914
GOC: Maj-Gen J.M.S. Brunker
 1st Battalion, Highland Light Infantry
 125th Napier's Rifles
 1st Battalion, 1st King George's Own Gurkha Rifles (The Malaun Regiment)
 1st Battalion, 4th Gurkha Rifles

Divisional Troops:
Mounted Troops:
15th Lancers (Cureton's Multanis)
Artillery:
V Brigade, Royal Field Artillery (RFA) - joined 22 November 1914 from 7th (Meerut) Division
64th, 73rd & 81st Batteries, V Brigade Ammunition Column
XI Brigade, RFA - joined 22 November 1914 from 7th (Meerut) Division
83rd, 84th & 85th Batteries, XI Brigade Ammunition Column
XVIII Brigade, RFA
59th, 93rd & 94th Batteries, XVIII Brigade Ammunition Column
109th Heavy Battery, Royal Garrison Artillery (4.7-inch guns)
Heavy Battery Ammunition Column
Lahore Divisional Ammunition Column
Engineers
20th & 21st Companies, 3rd Sappers and Miners
Signals Service:
Lahore Signal Company
Pioneers
34th Sikh Pioneers
Supply & Transport:
Lahore Divisional train
Medical Units:
7th & 8th British Field Ambulances
111th, 112th and 113th Indian Field Ambulances

The division finally got into action piecemeal at the simultaneous Battles of La Bassee, 1st Messines and Armentieres along the British part of the Western Front in October–November 1914. The degree to which the division was broken up can be gauged by the 29 October entry in the diary kept by the Indian corps' commander, Lt-Gen Sir James Willcocks:

"Where is my Lahore Division?Sirhind Brigade detained in Egypt.Ferozepore Brigade: somewhere in the north, split up into three or four bits.Jullunder Brigade: Manchesters gone south to (British) 5 Division (this disposes of only British unit)47th Sikhs: Half fighting with some British division; half somewhere else!59th Rifles and 15th Sikhs: In trenches34th Pioneers (divisional troops) also in trenches15th Lancers: In trenches.Two companies of Sappers and Miners fighting as infantry with British divisions.Divisional Headquarters: Somewhere?Thank heaven the Meerut Division will get a better chance."

When the troops were relieved in November 1914, the reassembled division defended a section of the front in Indian Corps' sector.

Western Front 1915
After winter operations (in which the Indian soldiers suffered badly) the division next took part in the Battles of Neuve Chapelle, Aubers Ridge, Festubert and Loos in 1915.

Order of Battle May 1915
GOC: Maj-Gen H.D'U. Keary

Ferozepore Brigade
GOC: Brig-Gen R.G. Egerton, CB
 1st Battalion, Connaught Rangers
 1/4th Battalion, London Regiment (Territorial Force)
 9th Bhopal Infantry
 57th Wilde's Rifles (Frontier Force)
 129th Duke of Connaught's Own Baluchis

Jullundur Brigade
GOC: Brig-Gen E.P. Strickland
 1st Battalion, Manchester Regiment
 1/4th Battalion, Suffolk Regiment (Territorial Force)
 1/5th Battalion, Border Regiment (Territorial Force)
 40th Pathans
 47th Sikhs
 59th Scinde Rifles (Frontier Force)

Sirhind Brigade
GOC: Brig-Gen W.G. Walker, VC
 1st Battalion, Highland Light Infantry
 4th (Extra Reserve) Battalion, King's (Liverpool Regiment) (Special Reserve) 
 15th Ludhiana Sikhs
 1st Battalion, 1st King George's Own Gurkha Rifles (The Malaun Regiment)
 1st Battalion, 4th Gurkha Rifles

Divisional Troops:
As before, with addition of XLIII (Howitzer Bde, RA (40th & 57th Batteries)

Mesopotamia
On 13 August 1915, General Sir John Nixon, commanding Indian Expeditionary Force D in Mesopotamia, requested one of the Indian infantry divisions in France as reinforcements for his advance on Baghdad. Coincidentally, on the same day, the Secretary of State for India, Austen Chamberlain, told the Viceroy of India that he was anxious for the Indian infantry to be withdrawn from France before they had to endure another winter. The system for supplying drafts had broken down and the Indian battalions were becoming very weak after the heavy casualties they had suffered. Although the Secretary of State for War, Lord Kitchener, objected to their withdrawal from the Western Front, orders were issued on 31 October for the two divisions of Indian Corps (3rd (Lahore) and 7th (Meerut) Division) to embark at Marseilles for Mesopotamia. They were to leave behind their attached Territorial Force and Special Reserve battalions, and the three RFA brigades of 18-pounder guns of 3rd (Lahore) Division. The two divisions were relieved in the front line on 6 November and were due at Basra in December, but their departure from Marseilles was delayed because of fear of submarine attack. 3rd (Lahore) Division finally arrived in Mesopotamia in April 1916 and joined Tigris Corps, too late to relieve 6th (Poona) Division at Kut-al-Amara.

Palestine
After the fall of Baghdad, the Palestine Campaign was given priority over Mesopotamia, and in March 1918 the division was transferred to Egypt to join Sir Edmund Allenby's Egyptian Expeditionary Force until the end of the war. At the Battle of Megiddo in September 1918 it formed part of Sir Edward Bulfin's XXI Corps on the right flank.

Order of Battle from May 1918
GOC: Maj-Gen A.R. Hoskins

7th Brigade:
 1st Battalion, Connaught Rangers
 27th Punjabis
 91st Punjabis (Light Infantry)
 2nd Battalion, 7th Gurkha Rifles
 7th Light Trench Mortar Battery

8th Brigade:
 1st Battalion, Manchester Regiment
 47th Sikhs
 59th Scinde Rifles (Frontier Force)
 2nd Battalion, 124th Duchess of Connaught's Own Baluchistan Infantry
 8th Light Trench Mortar Battery

9th Brigade:
 1st Battalion, Dorsetshire Regiment
 93rd Burma Infantry
 105th Mahratta Light Infantry
 1st Battalion, 1st King George's Own Gurkha Rifles (The Malaun Regiment)
 9th Light Trench Mortar Battery

Divisional Artillery (reorganised in April 1918):
 IV Brigade, RFA
 7, 14 and 66 18-pounder Batteries
 B/LXIX (Howitzer) Battery
 VIII Brigade, RFA
 372 and 373 18-pounder Batteries
 428 (Howitzer) Battery
 LIII Brigade, RFA
 66 and 374 18-pounder Batteries
 430 (Howitzer) Battery
(372, 373 and 374 were new six-gun 18-pounder batteries formed in 64th (2nd Highland) Division's billeting area round Norwich, England, in December 1916 and shipped to Mesopotamia.)

See also

 List of Indian divisions in World War I

References

Bibliography
 Army Council Instructions Issued During December 1916, London: HM Stationery Office.

External links
British Empire has list of all Indian Army regiments with pictures of their regimental badges.
Imperial Gazetteer of India 1908–30, gives complete list of Indian towns and their history and establishment.
The Long Long Trail, gives orders of battle and much more.
 

Indian World War I divisions
Military units and formations established in 1852
British Indian Army divisions